BJS may refer to:

Beijing Subway, Beijing's rapid transit system
Bharatiya Jana Sangh, a political party in India
BJ's Wholesale Club, a bulk retailer
BJ's Restaurant & Brewery, a casual dining restaurant chain
BJ Services Company, now a subsidiary of Baker Hughes
British Journal of Sociology, a sociological journal
British Journal of Surgery, a surgical journal
Bryan Jay Singer, American film director
Bureau of Justice Statistics, a unit of the United States Department of Justice whose principal function is the compilation and analysis of data and the dissemination of information for statistical purposes
Brimington Junior School, a school in Chesterfield, Derbyshire
Broomhill Junior school, a school in Brislington, Bristol 
Budapesti Japán Iskola or The Japanese School of Budapest, a Japanese international school in Hungary
BJS, combined IATA airport code  for Beijing, China metropolitan area
bjs, Bajan Creole language of Barbados (ISO 639-2 and ISO 639-5 codes)

See also 
 BJ (disambiguation)